The 1988 season was a memorable one for the Los Angeles Dodgers as a squad that was picked to finish fourth wound up winning the World Series, beating the heavily favored New York Mets and Oakland Athletics along the way. Kirk Gibson carried the Dodger offense, winning the National League Most Valuable Player Award. Orel Hershiser dominated on the mound, throwing a record 59 consecutive scoreless innings on his way to winning the Cy Young Award.

Offseason
 December 11, 1987: Acquired Alfredo Griffin, Jay Howell and Jesse Orosco in a three-team deal with the Oakland Athletics and New York Mets for Bob Welch, Jack Savage and Matt Young
January 29, 1988: Kirk Gibson was signed as a free agent.
April 1, 1988: Acquired John Gibbons from the New York Mets for Craig Shipley

With the sub-par 1987 performance fresh in their minds, General Manager Fred Claire and Field Manager Tom Lasorda knew what needed to be fixed.  They started the off-season by allowing poor performers such as Glenn Hoffman, Ken Landreaux and Phil Garner explore the free agent market.  On December 11, 1987, Claire pulled the trigger on a trade that helped solidify the Dodgers' defense and bullpen, despite giving up one of the top pitchers of the National League in 1987 in Bob Welch. The Dodgers acquired shortstop Alfredo Griffin and relief pitchers Jay Howell and Jesse Orosco in a three-team trade ironically with the Athletics and Mets, the two teams they would eventually defeat in the '88 postseason. In an attempt to boost the offense for the upcoming season, the Dodgers signed Mike Davis on December 15, 1987. The biggest move of the off-season was still to come.

On January 29, 1988, the Dodgers signed free agent slugger Kirk Gibson from the Detroit Tigers. Gibson, who was a 9-year veteran at the time of the signing, was known for his power at the plate and speed on the basepaths, but was also brought in to be a clubhouse leader. To help solidify their roster the Dodgers went on to sign 21-year veteran pitcher Don Sutton and 20-year veteran catcher Rick Dempsey.  Dempsey, known for his fiery personality, joined Gibson as the veteran clubhouse leaders.

It was Gibson, however, who would make the biggest impact. Preparing for his first spring training game as a Dodger on March 3, 1988, Gibson began his pregame warm-ups in the outfield. Taking off his hat to wipe sweat from his head, Gibson noticed people laughing. He soon realized that someone (it turned out to be reliever Jesse Orosco) had greased the inside of his cap with eyeblack and he had unknowingly wiped it all over himself in full view of the fans who were in attendance. Gibson immediately left the field in anger and left the Dodgers' spring training complex, missing the game.  The next day, manager Tommy Lasorda held a team meeting where Orosco apologized. The message was made clear, however: Gibson came to the Dodgers to win and was serious about it.

Key players from the 1987 team were also brought back. These players included right fielder Mike Marshall, center fielder John Shelby, catcher Mike Scioscia, Second Baseman Steve Sax, Utilityman Mickey Hatcher, and pitchers Orel Hershiser, Fernando Valenzuela, and Tim Leary.

Regular season

Season standings

Record vs. opponents

Opening Day lineup

Roster

Starting 9

Notable transactions
June 6, 1988: Raúl Mondesí was signed as an amateur free agent by the Dodgers.
June 27, 1988: Mario Soto was signed as a free agent by the Dodgers.
August 10, 1988: Don Sutton was released by the Dodgers.
August 16, 1988: Acquired John Tudor from the St. Louis Cardinals for Pedro Guerrero
August 30, 1988: Shawn Hillegas was traded by the Dodgers to the Chicago White Sox for Ricky Horton.
October 3, 1988: Acquired Jim Neidlinger from the Pittsburgh Pirates for Bill Krueger

Season summary

April
The Dodgers started the 1988 season at home against the San Francisco Giants.  The Dodgers opening day pitcher was Valenzuela.  The opening day lineup featured Sax, Griffin, Gibson, Marshall, Shelby, Davis, Scioscia and third baseman Pedro Guerrero.  The first pitch of the season, to Sax by Giants pitcher Dave Dravecky, was hit into the left field seats at Dodger Stadium.  However, Valenzuela would then give up the lead and the Dodgers would eventually lose the game 5–1. The team would go on to win their next five games and finish April with a 13–7 record which included a four-game sweep of the Atlanta Braves.  Hershiser finished the month of April with a 5–0 record.

May
The Dodgers went 14-13 during the month of May.  As it had always been, May was one of the toughest months for the Dodgers.  On May 21, 1988, Griffin was hit by a pitch from Mets pitcher Dwight Gooden on the hand.  Griffin would miss over two months with a broken hand.  This heated up the Dodger-Met rivalry which would last the remainder of the season.  In fact, the next day, May 22, 1988, Mets starting pitcher David Cone hit Pedro Guerrero in the head in the 6th inning.  As a show of disgust at what the Dodgers felt was headhunting by the Mets pitchers, Guerrero proceeded to stand up, throw his bat in Cone's direction and charge the mound.  A benches clearing mêlée ensued and Guerrero and Lasorda were ejected from the game.  Because Griffin had to be placed on the disabled list with a broken hand the Dodgers were left with a hole at shortstop, though they had a solid replacement in the form of veteran Dave Anderson.  At times during May, the lead over the Astros neared five games.  By the end of the month the Dodgers' lead in the NL West Division was only a half of a game over the Houston Astros.

June
The Dodgers had a solid month of June compiling a record of 17–9 over the month.  Hershiser continued his successful year by finishing the month of June with a record of 12–3.  Much of the Dodgers' success to this point in the season could be attributed to solid starting pitching from Hershiser, Leary and the emerging rookie Tim Belcher.  However, the best pitchers of the Dodgers' pitching staff were those who came out of the bullpen.  Orosco, Howell, Brian Holton and Alejandro Peña were all enjoying successful seasons.  After a slow start in April, Gibson was now hitting .288 with 15 HR's, 40 RBI, 53 runs scored and 15 SB's.

August
The summer success continued for the Dodgers as they completed August with a 17–12 record.
Don Sutton was released August 10 after GM Fred Claire discovered Sutton had informally  discussed a possible front office job with the Houston Astros. Sutton was 3–6 with a 3.92 ERA at the time. Sutton did not sign with another team. His 233 career wins with the Dodgers remains the team record.

Dramatic summer moments
Many who have followed the Dodgers have pointed to a few moments during the months of July and August that got the season going in the right direction, keep the successes going and exemplified what the 1988 Dodgers were all about.
 July 6, 1988:  Down 3–0 in the bottom of the 8th inning against the St. Louis Cardinals, the Dodgers scored three runs then Anderson, Mike Sharperson and Sax loaded the bases.  The Cardinals would bring in closer Todd Worrell in an attempt to snuff out the rally.  However, first baseman Franklin Stubbs would drive a Worrell offering into the right field seats for a game winning grand slam.
 August 13, 1988: The Dodgers and Giants take the Dodger Stadium fans to the 11th inning with a tie.  Guerrero starts the Dodgers side of the 11th inning with a fly ball to right that Giants outfielder Candy Maldonado loses in the lights.  A passed ball allows Guerrero to go to second.  However, Guerrero and Lasorda are then ejected from the game arguing that the Giants' pitcher had balked.  Because of this, Stubbs had to pinch run for Guerrero leaving the Dodgers with no additional pinch hitters on their bench.  When pitcher Alejandro Peña's batting spot comes around in the lineup they are forced to pinch hit for him with another pitcher, Tim Leary.  Amazingly, Leary singled back up the middle and Stubbs scored giving the Dodgers the extra inning walk off win.
 A week after Leary's dramatic game-winning hit, the Dodgers had another walk off win.  The Dodgers entered the bottom of the 9th inning at Dodger Stadium trailing the Montreal Expos 3–2.  The Expos brought in Joe Hesketh to close out the game.  After getting Sax out, Hesketh allowed Mickey Hatcher to double.  Anderson ran for Hatcher and Kirk Gibson singled home Anderson.  One out later with John Shelby at the plate, Gibson stole second base.  With John Shelby at the plate, Hesketh threw a wild pitch through catcher Nelson Santovenia.  Gibson advanced to third but did not stop there; the former linebacker kept going, charging toward the plate that was being covered by pitcher Hesketh.  Santovenia threw back to Hesketh but Gibson beat the throw to the plate giving the Dodgers the win.  Gibson later revealed that part of his reasoning for attempting to take home was that he knew Hesketh had suffered a broken leg earlier in his career and Gibson felt he would not be willing to risk a collision by stepping into the basepath to block off the plate.

September/October
Hershiser would begin a scoreless inning streak in September that he would eventually take to over 59 innings and pass Dodger legend Don Drysdale for the record for most consecutive scoreless innings.  Hershiser would throw complete game shutouts against the Braves on September 5, the Reds on September 10,  the Braves again on September 14, the Astros on September 19 and the Giants on September 23 to take him within 9 innings of Drysdale's record.  Before Hershiser would get a chance to break the record the Dodgers needed to clinch the National League West Championship.  Their chance came in San Diego  on September 26.  The San Diego Padres would take a 2–0 lead in the first inning.  But the Dodgers would get 3 runs back and win the game 3–2, clinching the division.  Hershiser would get his next start on September 28 and he would pitch 10 scoreless innings against the Padres to break Drysdale's record.

Game log

Regular season Game log

|-style=background:#fbb
| 1 || April 4 || 1:13pm PDT || Giants || L 1–5 || Dravecky (1–0) || Valenzuela (0–1) || – || 48,484 || 0–1 || L1
|-style=background:#cfc
| 2 || April 5 || 7:05pm PDT || Giants || W 5–0 || Hershiser (1–0) || Downs (0–1) || – || 37,472 || 1–1 || W1
|-style=background:#cfc
| 3 || April 7 || 4:41pm PDT || @ Braves || W 5–2 || Peña (1–0) || Assenmaacher (0–1) || Orosco (1) || 5,257 || 2–1 || W2
|-style=background:#cfc
| 4 || April 8 || 4:41pm PDT || @ Braves || W 6–3 || Leary (1–0) || Coffman (0–1) || Belcher (1) || 10,723 || 3–1 || W3
|-style=background:#cfc
| 5 || April 9 || 4:41pm PDT || @ Braves || W 11–3 || Valenzuela (1–1) || Glavine (0–1) || – || 16,603 || 4–1 || W4
|-style=background:#cfc
| 6 || April 10 || 11:07am PDT || @ Braves || W 3–1 || Hershiser (2–0) || Mahler (0–1) || Orosco (2) || 14,171 || 5–1 || W5
|-style=background:#fbb
| 7 || April 12 || 7:25pm PDT || @ Padres || L 3–5 || Hawkins (1–1) ||  Sutton (0–1) || Davis (1) || 52,395 || 5–2 || L1
|-style=background:#cfc
| 8 || April 13 || 7:05pm PDT || @ Padres || W 4–3 || Howell (1–0)|| Show (0–2) || Orosco (3) || 16,838 || 6–2 || W1
|-style=background:#fbb
| 9 || April 14 || 1:05pm PDT || @ Padres || L 0–2 || Jones (1–1) || Valenzuela (1–2) || McCullers (2) || 24,096 || 6–3 || L1
|-style=background:#cfc
| 10 || April 15 || 7:08pm PDT || Braves || W 3–2 || Hershiser (3–0) || Glavine (0–2) || – || 41,222 || 7–3 || W1
|-style=background:#cfc
| 11 || April 16 || 1:05pm PDT || Braves || W 7–4 || Belcher (1–0) || Mahler (0–2) || Peña (2) || 27,114 || 8–3 || W2
|-style=background:#fbb
| 12 || April 17 || 1:05pm PDT || Braves || L 1–3 || Smith (1–2) || Sutton (0–2) || – || 46,484 || 8–4 || L1
|-style=background:#cfc
| 13 || April 18 || 7:08pm PDT || Padres || W 6–0 || Leary (2–0) || Show (0–3) || – || 24,357 || 9–4 || W1
|-style=background:#bbb
|–|| April 19 || || Padres || colspan=8 | Postponed (Rain) (Makeup date: June 17)
|-style=background:#bbb
|–|| April 20 || || Padres || colspan=8 | Postponed (Rain) (Makeup date: June 19)
|-style=background:#bbb
|–|| April 21 || || Padres || colspan=8 | Postponed (Rain) (Makeup date: September 21)
|-style=background:#bbb
|–|| April 22 || || @ Giants || colspan=8 | Postponed (Rain) (Makeup date: July 26)
|-style=background:#cfc
| 14 || April 23 || 12:25pm PDT || @ Giants || W 10–3 || Hershiser (4–0) || Krukow (1–1) || – || 33,271 || 10–4 || W2
|-style=background:#cfc
| 15 || April 24 || 1:05pm PDT || @ Giants || W 4–0 || Valenzuela (2–2) || LaCoss (1–2) || Howell (1) || 39,092 || 11–4 || W3
|-style=background:#fbb
| 16 || April 26 || 7:07pm PDT || Cubs || L 3–7 || Maddux (4–1) || Leary (2–1) || – || 34,279 || 11–5 || L1
|-style=background:#cfc
| 17 || April 27 || 7:07pm PDT || Cubs || W 4–0 || Sutton (1–2) || Moyer (1–2) || Peña (3) || 29,462 || 12–5 || W1
|-style=background:#fbb
| 18 || April 28 || 7:05pm PDT || Cubs || L 1–5 || Schiraldi (1–2) || Belcher (1–1) || DiPino (1) || 29,509 || 12–6 || L1
|-style=background:#cfc
| 19 || April 29 || 7:05pm PDT || Cardinals || W 6–4 ||Hershiser (5–0) || Cox (2–3) || Howell (2)  || 44,301 || 13–6 || W1
|-style=background:#fbb
| 20 || April 30 || 7:05pm PDT || Cardinals || L 2–5 || O'Neal (2–1) || Valenzuela (2–3) || McWilliams (1) || 47,425 || 13–7 || L1
|-

|-style=background:#fbb
| 21 || May 1 || 1:05pm PDT || Cardinals || L 0–9 || Tudor (1–0) || Leary (2–2) || Terry (1) || 46,176 || 13–8 || L2
|-style=background:#cfc
| 22 || May 2 || 7:08pm PDT || Pirates || W 6–3 || Orosco (1–0) || Drabek (3–2) || – || 26,821 || 14–8 || W1
|-style=background:#cfc
| 23 || May 3 || 7:05pm PDT || Pirates || W 14–6 || Belcher (2–1) || Dunne (1–1) || – || 26,943 || 15–8 || W2
|-style=background:#cfc
| 24 || May 4 || 7:05pm PDT || Pirates || W 8–5 || Hershiser (6–0) || Palacios (0–2) || – || 30,423 || 16–8 || W3
|-style=background:#cfc
| 25 || May 6 || 5:35pm PDT || @ Cardinals || W 10–2 || Valenzuela (3–3) || O'Neal (2–2) || – || 49,194 || 17–8 || W4
|-style=background:#fbb
| 26 || May 7 || 5:05pm PDT || @ Cardinals || L 1–2 || Worrell (1–2) || Orosco (1–1) || – || 46,159 || 17–9 || L1
|-style=background:#cfc
| 27 || May 8 || 11:15am PDT || @ Cardinals || W 12–6 || Sutton (2–2) || DeLeón (2–3) || – || 40,098 || 18–9 || W1
|-style=background:#bbb
|–|| May 9 || || @ Cubs || colspan=8 | Postponed (Rain) (Makeup date: July 14)
|-style=background:#cfc
| 28 || May 10 || 11:20am PDT || @ Cubs || W 6–5  || Holton (1–0) || Lancaster (1–3) || Hershiser (1) || 12,985 || 19–9 || W2
|-style=background:#fbb
| 29 || May 11 || 4:05pm PDT || @ Pirates || L 1–2  || Medvin (1–0) || Peña (1–1) || – || 26,367 || 19–10 || L1
|-style=background:#fbb
| 30 || May 12 || 4:05pm PDT || @ Pirates || L 4–7 || Smiley (3–2) || Hershiser (6–1) || – || 11,072 || 19–11 || L2
|-style=background:#fbb
| 31 || May 13 || 7:05pm PDT || Phillies || L 1–2 || Gross (3–1) ||Leary (2–3) || Tekulve (2) || 38,015 || 19–12 || L3
|-style=background:#cfc
| 32 || May 14 || 7:05pm PDT || Phillies || W 3–2 || Sutton (3–2) || Ruffin (3–3) ||Howell (3) || 47,379 || 20–12 || W1
|-style=background:#cfc
| 33 || May 15 || 1:05pm PDT || Phillies || W 9–2 ||Belcher (3–1) || Palmer (0–3) || || 41,045 || 21–12 || W2
|-style=background:#fbb
| 34 || May 17 || 7:10pm PDT || Expos || L 5–6 || Heaton (1–2) || Valenzuela (3–4) || Burke (5) || 34,309 || 21–13 || L1
|-style=background:#fbb
| 35 || May 18 || 7:05pm PDT || Expos || L 0–3 || Dopson (1–1)|| Hershiser (6–2) || Burke (6) || 27,775 || 21–14 || L2
|-style=background:#cfc
| 36 || May 19 || 7:05pm PDT || Expos || W 2–0 || Leary (3–3) || Martínez (3–6) || || 25,283 || 22–14 || W1
|-style=background:#fbb
| 37 || May 20 || 7:05pm PDT || Mets || L 2–5 || Fernandez (2–3) || Sutton (3–3) || Myers (6) || 44,867 || 22–15 || L1
|-style=background:#fbb
| 38 || May 21 || 7:05pm PDT || Mets || L 0–4 || Gooden (8–0) || Belcher (3–12)|| || 47,017 || 22–16 || L2
|-style=background:#fbb
| 39 || May 22 || 1:08pm PDT || Mets || L 2–5 || Cone (6–0) || Valenzuela (3–5) || McDowell (5) || 44,826 || 22–17 || L3
|-style=background:#cfc
| 40 || May 24 || 2:55pm PDT || @ Phillies || W 2–1  || Peña (2–1) || Harris (0–1 )|| Orosco (4) || 17,759 || 23–17 || W1
|-style=background:#cfc
| 41 || May 25 || 4:35pm PDT || @ Phillies || W 4–0 || Leary (4–3) || Palmer (0–4) || || 24,444 || 24–17 || W2
|-style=background:#cfc
| 42 || May 26 || 4:37pm PDT || @ Phillies || W 10–8 || Howell (2–0) || Bedrosian (0–1) || || 19,361 || 25–17 || W3
|-style=background:#cfc
| 43 || May 27 || 4:35pm PDT || @ Expos || W 5–2 || Orosco (2–1) || McClure (1–2) || Peña (3) || 18,113 || 26–17 || W4
|-style=background:#fbb
| 44 || May 28 || 10:35am PDT || @ Expos || L 2–3  || Parrett (4–1) || Howell (2–1) || || 15,320 || 26–18 || L1
|-style=background:#cfc
| 45 || May 29 || 10:35am PDT || @ Expos || W 2–1 || Hershiser (7–2) || Dopson (1–2) || || 35,311 || 27–18 || W1
|-style=background:#fbb
| 46 || May 30 || 5:05pm PDT || @ Mets || L 2–3 ||Darling (6–3) || Leary (4–4) || Myers (8) || 42,096 || 27–19 || L1
|-style=background:#fbb
| 47 || May 31 || 4:40pm PDT || @ Mets || L 4–5  || Myers (3–0) || Peña (2–2) || || 35,564 || 27–20 || L2
|-

|-style=background:#cfc
| 48 || June 1 || 5:02pm PDT || @ Mets || W 4–3 ||Holton (2–0) || Fernandez (2–5) || Howell (4) || 29,659 || 28–20 || W1
|-style=background:#cfc
| 49 || June 3 || 7:35pm PDT || Reds || W 13–5 || Crews (1–0) || Rasmussen (2–6) || || 45,242 || 29–20 || W2
|-style=background:#fbb
| 50 || June 4 || 12:28pm PDT || Reds || L 2–5 || Rijo (6–1) || Hershiser (7–3) || || 32,550 || 29–21 || L1
|-style=background:#cfc
| 51 || June 5 || 1:06pm PDT || Reds || W 5–4 ||Leary (5–4) || Soto (3–5) || Howell (5) || 38,982 || 30–21 || W1
|-style=background:#fbb
| 52 || June 6 || 5:13pm PDT || Astros || L 4–10 || Knepper (7–1 )|| Peña (2–3)  || Andersen (2) || 19,327 || 30–22 || L1
|-style=background:#fbb
| 53 || June 7 || 7:35pm PDT || Astros || L 2–5 || Darwin (3–4) || Belcher (3–3) || || 25,509 || 30–23 || L2
|-style=background:#cfc
| 54 || June 8 || 7:40pm PDT || Astros || W 11–1 ||Valenzuela (4–5) || Scott (6–2) || || 33,737 || 31–23 || W1
|-style=background:#cfc
| 55 || June 9 || 1:05pm PDT || Astros || W 4–2 ||  Hershiser (8–3) || Ryan (5–4) ||Howell (6) || 25,959 || 32–23 || W2
|-style=background:#fbb
| 56 || June 10 || 7:05pm PDT || @ Padres || L 3–4 || McCullers (1–4) || Howell  (2–2) || – || 19,859 || 32–24 || L1
|-style=background:#fbb
| 57 || June 11 || 7:05pm PDT || @ Padres || L 1–2 || Rasmussen (3–6) || Sutton (3–4) || – || 26,068 || 32–25 || L2
|-style=background:#fbb
| 58 || June 12 || 1:05pm PDT || @ Padres || L 2–5 || Whitson (6–5) || Belcher (3–4) || Davis (9) || 21,533 || 32–26 || L3
|-style=background:#cfc
| 59 || June 14 || 4:40pm PDT || @ Braves || W 5–4 || Valenzuela (5–5) || Smith (1–7) || Howell (7) || 11,136 || 33–26 || W1
|-style=background:#cfc
| 60 || June 15 || 4:40pm PDT || @ Braves || W 7–5 ||  Hershiser (9–3) || Glavine (3–7) || Peña (4) || 10,154 || 34–26 || W2
|-style=background:#fbb
| 61 || June 16 || 2:40pm PDT || @ Braves || L 2–9 || Smith (3–3) || K. Howell (0–1) || – || 9,666 || 34–27 || L1
|-style=background:#fbb
| 62 || June 17  || 4:08pm PDT || Padres || L 4–7 || Whitson (7–5) ||Leary (5–5) || Davis (11) || N/A || 34–28 || L2
|-style=background:#fbb
| 63 || June 17  || 7:20pm PDT || Padres || L 3–4 || Rasmussen (4–6) || Holton (2–1) || McCullers (6) || 33,649 || 34–29 || L3
|-style=background:#cfc
| 64 || June 18 || 1:09pm PDT || Padres || W 3–0 || Belcher (4–4) || Show (5–7) || Howell (8) ||37,743 || 35–29 || W1
|-style=background:#cfc
| 65 || June 19  || 1:06pm PDT || Padres || W 12–2 || Hershiser (10–3) || Jones (5–6) || – || N/A || 36–29 || W2
|-style=background:#cfc
| 66 || June 19  || 3:59pm PDT || Padres || W 5–4  || Crews (2–0) || Davis (2–4) || – || 37,045 || 37–29 || W3
|-style=background:#cfc
| 67 || June 20 || 7:38pm PDT || Braves || W 7–3 || Hillegas (1–0) || Glavine (3–8) || Peña (5)  || 43,268 || 38–29 || W4
|-style=background:#cfc
| 68 || June 21 || 7:35pm PDT || Braves || W 2–1 || Leary (6–5) || Smith (3–4) || – || 18,485 || 39–29 || W5
|-style=background:#fbb
| 69 || June 22 || 7:35pm PDT || Braves || L 1–4 || Mahler (8–6) || Sutton (3–5) || – || 27,878 || 39–30 || L1
|-style=background:#cfc
| 70 || June 24 || 4:35pm PDT || @ Reds || W 5–3 || Hershiser (11–3) || Robinson (3–6) || Belcher (2) || 33,781 || 40–30 || W1
|-style=background:#cfc
| 71 || June 25 || 4:06pm PDT || @ Reds || W 6–4 || Holton (3–1) ||  Rijo (8–3)||Orosco (5) || 35,470 || 41–30 || W2
|-style=background:#cfc
| 72 || June 26 || 11:15am PDT || @ Reds || W 9–6 || Belcher (5–4) || Franco (1–5) || Holton (1) || 29,520 || 42–30 || W3
|-style=background:#cfc
| 73 || June 27 || 5:35pm PDT || @ Astros || W 4–0 ||Hillegas (2–0) ||Andújar (0–3) || Peña (6) || 27,185 || 43–30 || W4
|-style=background:#fbb
| 74 || June 28 || 5:35pm PDT || @ Astros || L 3–4 || Knepper (8–1) || Holton (3–2) || Agosto (1) || 28,838 || 43–31 || L1
|-style=background:#cfc
| 75 || June 29 || 11:35am PDT || @ Astros || W 2–0 || Hershiser (12–3) || Ryan (5–6) || || 27,678 || 44–31 || W1
|-

|-style=background:#fbb
| 76 || July 1 || 7:37pm PDT || Cubs || L 2–9 || Moyer (5–7) || Valenzuela (5–6) || – || 42,763 || 44–32 || L1
|-style=background:#cfc
| 77 || July 2 || 7:07pm PDT || Cubs || W 8–1 || Leary (7–5) || Pico (3–3) || – || 44,166 || 45–32 || W1
|-style=background:#fbb
| 78 || July 3 || 1:05pm PDT || Cubs || L 1–2 || Sufcliffe (7–5) || Hillegas (2–1) || Lancaster (4) || 43,209 || 45–33 || L1
|-style=background:#cfc
| 79 || July 4 || 5:10pm PDT || Cardinals || W 5–3 || Peña (3–3) || Tudor (4–3) || Belcher (3) || 44,855 || 46–33 || W1
|-style=background:#cfc
| 80 || July 5 || 7:35pm PDT || Cardinals || W 6–3 || Hershiser (13–3) || Cox (2–4) || Belcher (4) || 32,495 || 47–33 || W2
|-style=background:#cfc
| 81 || July 6 || 7:37pm PDT || Cardinals || W 7–3 || Crews (3–0) || Worrell (4–5) || – || 37,210 || 48–33 || W3
|-style=background:#fbb
| 82 || July 8 || 7:35pm PDT || Pirates || L 3–4 || Drabek (6–5) || Leary (7–6) || Gott (11) || 40,690 || 48–34 || L1
|-style=background:#fbb
| 83 || July 9 || 7:05pm PDT || Pirates || L 2–8 || Dunne (6–7) || Hillegas (2–2) || – || 46,662 || 48–35 || L2
|-style=background:#fbb
| 84 || July 10 || 1:08pm PDT || Pirates || L 2–7 || Walk (10–4) || Hershiser (13–4) || – || 43,014 || 48–36 || L3
|- style="background:#bbcaff;"
| – || July 12 || 5:30pm PDT ||colspan=8 |59th All-Star Game in Cincinnati, Ohio
|-style=background:#cfc
| 85 || July 14  || 10:05am PDT || @ Cubs || W 1–0 || Leary (8–6) || Sufcliffe (7–7) || Peña (7) || N/A || 49–36 || W1
|-style=background:#cfc
| 86 || July 14  || 12:24pm PDT || @ Cubs || W 6–3 || Holton (4–2) || Schiraldi (4–8) || Howell (9) || 34,031 || 50–36 || W2
|-style=background:#cfc
| 87 || July 15 || 1:05pm PDT || @ Cubs|| W 3–2  || Peña (4–3) || Nipper (1–3) || Orosco (6) || 32,179 || 51–36 || W3
|-style=background:#fff
| 88|| July 16 || 10:20am PDT || @ Cubs || T 2–2  || – || – || – || 32,843 || 51–36–1 || T1
|-style=background:#cfc
| 89 || July 17  || 10:20am PDT || @ Cubs || W 4–1 || Belcher (6–4) || Pico (3–5) || Peña (8) || N/A || 52–36–1 || W1
|-style=background:#cfc
| 90 || July 17  || 12:45pm PDT || @ Cubs || W 5–2 || Holton (5–2) || Lancaster (4–5) || Howell (10) || 35,138 || 53–36–1 || W2
|-style=background:#cfc
| 91 || July 18 || 5:35pm PDT || @ Cardinals || W 1–0 || Leary (9–6) || Worrell (4–7) || – || 29,358 || 54–36–1 || W3
|-style=background:#fbb
| 92 || July 19 || 5:35pm PDT || @ Cardinals || L 2–3 || DeLeón (6–7) || || Worrell (17) || 34,606 || 54–37–1 || L1
|-style=background:#fbb
| 93 || July 20 || 10:35am PDT || @ Cardinals || L 7–8 || Costello (3–0) || Valenzuela (5–7) || Worrell (18) || 31,845 || 54–38–1 || L2
|-style=background:#fbb
| 94 || July 21 || 4:35pm PDT || @ Pirates || L 2–3 || Drabek (8–5) || Hershiser (13–5) || Gott (15) || 27,510 || 54–39–1 || L3
|-style=background:#cfc
| 95 || July 22 || 4:35pm PDT || @ Pirates || W 4–2 || Belcher (7–4) || Dunne (6–8) || Howell (11) || 44,888 || 55–39–1 || W1
|-style=background:#cfc
| 96 || July 23 || 4:37pm PDT || @ Pirates || W 6–2 || Leary (10–6) || Smiley (9–6) || – || 35,817 || 56–39–1 || W2
|-style=background:#cfc
| 97 || July 24 || 10:36am PDT || @ Pirates || W 2–1 || Hillegas (3–2) || Fisher (6–7) || Howell (12) || 35,677 || 57–39–1 || W3
|-style=background:#fbb
| 98 || July 25 || 5:17pm PDT || @ Giants || L 1–3 || Downs (10–8) || Valenzuela (5–8) || – || 29,947 || 57–40–1 || L1
|-style=background:#cfc
| 99 || July 26  || 5:35pm PDT || @ Giants || W 7–3 || Hershiser (14–5) || Mulholland (2–1) || Howell (13) || N/A || 58–40–1 || W1
|-style=background:#cfc
| 100 || July 26  || 9:10pm PDT || @ Giants || W 6–5  || Holton (6–2) || Garrelts (2–1) || – || 49,209 || 59–40–1 || W2
|-style=background:#fbb
| 101 || July 27 || 7:35pm PDT || @ Giants || L  1–2  || Price (1–4) || Leary (10–7) || – || 34,168 || 59–41–1 || L1
|-style=background:#fbb
| 102 || July 29 || 7:37pm PDT || Astros || L 1–3 || || || || || 59–42–1 || L2
|-style=background:#fbb
| 103 || July 30 || 12:22pm PDT || Astros || L || || || || || 59–43–1 || L3
|-style=background:#cfc
| 104 || July 31 || 1:05pm PDT || Astros || W || Hershiser (15–5) || || || || 60–43–1 || W1
|-

|-style=background:#fbb
| 105 || August 1 || 5:14pm PDT || Reds || L || || || || || 60–44–1 || L1
|-style=background:#cfc
| 106 || August 2 || 7:00pm PDT || Reds || W || || || || || 61–44–1 || W1
|-style=background:#fbb
| 107 || August 3 || 7:36pm PDT || Reds || L  || || || || || 61–45–1 || L1
|-style=background:#fbb
| 108 || August 5 || 5:35pm PDT || @ Astros || L || || Hershiser (15–6) || || || 61–46–1 || L1
|-style=background:#cfc
| 109 || August 6 || 5:35pm PDT || @ Astros || W || || || || || 62–46–1 || W1
|-style=background:#fbb
| 110 || August 7 || 11:35am PDT || @ Astros || L || || || || || 62–47–1 || L1
|-style=background:#fbb
| 111 || August 8 || 5:35pm PDT || @ Astros || L || || || || || 62–48–1 || L2
|-style=background:#fbb
| 112 || August 9 || 5:09pm PDT || @ Reds || L || || || || || 62–49–1 || L3
|-style=background:#cfc
| 113 || August 10 || 4:36pm PDT || @ Reds || W || Hershiser (16–6) || || || || 63–49–1 || W1
|-style=background:#fbb
| 114 || August 11 || 4:35pm PDT || @ Reds || L  || || || || || 63–50–1 || L1
|-style=background:#cfc
| 115 || August 12 || 7:38pm PDT || Giants || W 7–3 || Leary (12–8) || Reuschel (15–6) || Peña (9) || 48,744 || 64–50–1 || W1
|-style=background:#cfc
| 116 || August 13 || 7:10pm PDT || Giants || W 2–1  || Peña (5–5) || Price (1–5) || – || 47,649 || 65–50–1 || W2
|-style=background:#fbb
| 117 || August 14 || 1:08pm PDT || Giants || L 4–15 || Downs (12–9) || Hershiser (16–7) || Brantley (1) || 45,502 || 65–51–1 || L1
|-style=background:#cfc
| 118 || August 15 || 7:35pm PDT || Giants || W 1–0 || Belcher (9–4) || Robinson (4–3) || Orosco (7) || 49,306 || 66–51–1 || W1
|-style=background:#cfc
| 119 || August 16 || 7:30pm PDT || Phillies || W || || || || || 67–51–1 || W2
|-style=background:#cfc
| 120 || August 17 || 7:38pm PDT || Phillies || W|| || || || || 68–51–1 || W3
|-style=background:#cfc
| 121 || August 18 || 1:05pm PDT || Phillies || W || || || || || 69–51–1 || W4
|-style=background:#cfc
| 122 || August 19 || 7:37pm PDT || Expos || W || Hershiser (17–7) || || || || 70–51–1 || W5
|-style=background:#cfc
| 123 || August 20 || 7:35pm PDT || Expos || W || || || || || 71–51–1 || W6
|-style=background:#cfc
| 124 || August 21 || 1:05pm PDT || Expos || W || || || || || 72–51–1 || W7
|-style=background:#fbb
| 125 || August 22 || 7:35pm PDT || Mets || L 1–7 || || || || || 72–52–1 || L1
|-style=background:#fbb
| 126 || August 23 || 7:38pm PDT || Mets || L 1–5 || || || || || 72–53–1 || L2
|-style=background:#fbb
| 127 || August 24 || 7:38pm PDT || Mets || L 1–2 || || Hershiser (17–8) || || || 72–54–1 || L3
|-style=background:#cfc
| 128 || August 26 || 4:35pm PDT || @ Phillies || W || || || || || 73–54–1 || W1
|-style=background:#cfc
| 129 || August 27 || 4:06pm PDT || @ Phillies || W || || || || || 74–54–1 || W2
|-style=background:#cfc
| 130 || August 28 || 10:35am PDT || @ Phillies || W || || || || || 75–54–1 || W3
|-style=background:#cfc
| 131 || August 29 || 4:35pm PDT || @ Expos || W || || || || || 76–54–1 || W4
|-style=background:#cfc
| 132 || August 30 || 4:35pm PDT || @ Expos || W || Hershiser (18–8) || || || || 77–54–1 || W5
|-style=background:#fbb
| 133 || August 31 || 4:35pm PDT || @ Expos || L || || || || || 77–55–1 || L1
|-

|-style=background:#fbb
| 134 || September 2 || 4:35pm PDT || @ Mets || L || || || || || 77–56–1 || L2
|-style=background:#fbb
| 135 || September 3 || 11:30am PDT || @ Mets || L 1–2 || || || || || 77–57–1 || L3
|-style=background:#bbb
|–|| September 4 || || @ Mets || colspan=8 | Postponed (Rain) (Makeup date: No rescheduling)
|-style=background:#cfc
| 136 || September 5 || 4:40pm PDT || @ Braves || W 3–0 || Hershiser (19–8) || Mahler (9–13) || – || 10,768 || 78–57–1 || W1
|-style=background:#fbb
| 137 || September 6 || 11:42am PDT || @ Braves || L 1–2 || Assenmaacher (7–6) || Orosco (2–2) || Sutter (13) || 7,245 || 78–58–1 || L1
|-style=background:#cfc
| 138 || September 7 || 7:38pm PDT || Astros || W || || || || || 79–58–1 || W1
|-style=background:#fbb
| 139 || September 8 || 7:38pm PDT || Astros || L 1–2 || || || || || 79–59–1 || L1
|-style=background:#fbb
| 140 || September 9 || 7:39pm PDT || Reds || L || || || || || 79–60–1 || L2
|-style=background:#cfc
| 141 || September 10 || 7:05pm PDT || Reds || W || Hershiser (20–8) || || || || 80–60–1 || W1
|-style=background:#cfc
| 142 || September 11 || 1:05pm PDT || Reds || W || || || || || 81–60–1 || W2
|-style=background:#cfc
| 143 || September 12 || 7:35pm PDT || Braves || W 5–4 || Leary (17–9) || Glavine (6–16) || Peña (10) || 24,578 || 82–60–1 || W3
|-style=background:#cfc
| 144 || September 13 || 7:38pm PDT || Braves || W 2–0 || Tudor (9–8) || Smoltz (2–5) || Howell (19) || 22,758 || 83–60–1 || W4
|-style=background:#cfc
| 145 || September 14 || 7:37pm PDT || Braves || W 1–0 || Hershiser (21–8) || Mahler (9–15) || – || 42,434 || 84–60–1 || W5
|-style=background:#fbb
| 146 || September 16 || 7:02pm PDT || @ Reds || L || || || || || 84–61–1 || L1
|-style=background:#cfc
| 147 || September 17 || 4:06pm PDT || @ Reds || W || || || || || 85–61–1 || W1
|-style=background:#cfc
| 148 || September 18 || 10:00am PDT || @ Reds || W || || || || || 86–61–1 || W2
|-style=background:#cfc
| 149 || September 19 || 5:35pm PDT || @ Astros || W || Hershiser (22–8) || || || || 87–61–1 || W3
|-style=background:#cfc
| 150 || September 20 || 2:00pm PDT || @ Astros || W || || || || || 88–61–1 || W4
|-style=background:#fbb
| 151  || September 21 || 5:05pm PDT || Padres || L 3–9 || Rasmussen (15–9) || Martínez (1–3) || – || N/A || 88–62–1 || L1
|-style=background:#cfc
| 152  || September 21 || 8:25pm PDT || Padres || W 6–5  || Howell (5–3) || Davis (5–10) || – || 31,120 || 89–62–1 || W1
|-style=background:#fbb
| 153 || September 22 || 7:35pm PDT || Padres || L 4–5 || Show (15–11) || Peña (5–7) || – || 30,074 || 89–63–1 || L1
|-style=background:#cfc
| 154 || September 23 || 7:39pm PDT || @ Giants || W 3–0 || Hershiser (23–8) || Hammaker (8–9) || – || 22,341 || 90–63–1 || W1
|-style=background:#cfc
| 155 || September 24 || 1:05pm PDT || @ Giants || W 7–3 || Horton (1–0) || Wilson (0–2) || Orosco (9) || 34,214 || 91–63–1 || W2
|-style=background:#fbb
| 156 || September 25 || 1:00pm PDT || @ Giants || L 0–2 || Cook (2–0) || Belcher (11–6) || – || 40,743 || 91–64–1 || L1
|-style=background:#cfc
| 157 || September 26 || 7:07pm PDT || @ Padres || W 3–2 || Peña (6–7) || Rasmussen (15–10) || Howell (21) || 18,552 || 92–64–1 || W1
|-style=background:#fbb
| 158 || September 27 || 7:05pm PDT || @ Padres || L 4–8 || Show (16–11) || Leary (17–10) || – || 13,325 || 92–65–1 || L1
|-style=background:#fbb
| 159 || September 28 || 7:10pm PDT || @ Padres || L 1–2  || Leiper (3–0) || Horton (1–1) || – || 22,596 || 92–66–1 || L2
|-style=background:#cfc
| 160 || September 30 || 7:35pm PDT || Giants || W 6–4 || Holton (7–3) || Cook (2–1) || Peña (12) || 42,580 || 93–66–1 || W1
|-

|-style=background:#cfc
| 161 || October 1 || 1:07pm PDT || Giants || W 2–1 || Belcher (12–6) || Reuschel (19–11) || Valenzuela (1) || 33,951 || 94–66–1 || W2
|-style=background:#fbb
| 162 || October 2 || 1:09pm PDT || Giants || L 0–1 || Robinson (10–5) || Leary (17–11) || – || 44,055 || 94–67–1 || L1
|-

|-
| Legend:       = Win       = Loss       = PostponementBold = Dodgers team member

Postseason Game log

|-style=background:#fbb
| 1 || October 4 || 5:28pm PDT || Mets || L 2–3 || Myers (1–0) || Howell (0–1) || || 55,582 || 0–1 || L1
|-style=background:#cfc
| 2 || October 5 || 7:08pm PDT || Mets || W 6–3 || Belcher (1–0) || Cone (0–1) || Peña (1) || 55,780 || 1–1 || W1
|-style=background:#bbb
|–|| October 7 || || @ Mets || colspan="8"|Postponed (Rain) (Makeup date: October 8)
|-style=background:#fbb
| 3 || October 8 || 9:20am PDT || @ Mets || L 4–8 || Myers (2–0) || Peña (0–1) || || 44,672 || 1–2 || L1
|-style=background:#cfc
| 4 || October 9 || 5:22pm PDT || @ Mets || W 5–4  || Peña (1–1) || McDowell (0-1) || Hershiser (1) || 54,014 || 2–2 || W1
|-style=background:#cfc
| 5 || October 10 || 9:00am PDT || @ Mets || W 7–4 || Belcher (2–0) || Fernandez (0–1) || Holton (1) || 52,069 || 3–2 || W2
|-style=background:#fbb
| 6 || October 11 || 5:22pm PDT || Mets || L 1–5 || Cone (1–1) || Leary (0–1) || || 55,885 || 3–3 || L1
|-style=background:#cfc
| 7 || October 12 || 5:22pm PDT || Mets || W 6–0 || Hershiser (1–0) || Darling (0–1) || || 55,693 || 4–3 || W1
|-

|-  bgcolor="ffbbbb"
|-style=background:#cfc
| 1 || October 15 || 5:30pm PDT || Athletics || W 5–4 || Peña (1–0) || Eckersley (0–1) || – || 55,983 || 1–0 || W1
|-style=background:#cfc
| 2 || October 16 || 5:25pm PDT || Athletics || W 6–0 || Hershiser (1–0) || Davis (0–1) || – || 56,051 || 2–0 || W2
|-style=background:#fbb
| 3 || October 18 || 5:30pm PDT || @ Athletics || L 1–2 || Honeycutt (1–0) || Howell (0–1) || – || 49,316 || 2-1 || L1
|-style=background:#cfc
| 4 || October 19 || 5:25pm PDT || @ Athletics || W 4–3 || Belcher (1–0) || Stewart (0–1) || Howell (1) || 49,317 || 3–1 || W1
|-style=background:#cfc
| 5 || October 20 || 5:39pm PDT || @ Athletics || W 5–2 || Hershiser (2–0) || Davis (0–2) || – || 49,317 || 4–1 || W2
|-

|-
| Legend:       = Win       = Loss       = PostponementBold = Dodgers team member

Player stats

Batting

Starters by position
Note: Pos = Position; G = Games played; AB = At bats; H = Hits; Avg. = Batting average; HR = Home runs; RBI = Runs batted in

Other batters
Note: G = Games played; AB = At bats; H = Hits; Avg. = Batting average; HR = Home runs; RBI = Runs batted in

Pitching

Starting pitchers
Note: G = Games pitched; GS = Games started; IP = Innings pitched; W = Wins; L = Losses; ERA = Earned run average; BB = Walks allowed; SO = Strikeouts; CG = Complete games

Other pitchers
Note: G = Games pitched; IP = Innings pitched; W = Wins; L = Losses; ERA = Earned run average; SO = Strikeouts

Relief pitchers
Note: G = Games pitched; IP = Innings pitched; W = Wins; L = Losses; SV = Saves; ERA = Earned run average; BB = Walks allowed; SO = Strikeouts

Playoffs

National League Championship Series

The Dodgers faced the New York Mets in the LCS. The Mets had dominated the Dodgers during the regular season, winning 10 out of 11 meetings and were heavy favorites going into the series. But the Dodgers, led by series MVP Orel Hershiser (who pitched a complete game shutout in game 7) won the series 4 games to 3.

World Series

The Dodgers were again heavy underdogs in the World Series against the Oakland Athletics, led by sluggers Mark McGwire and José Canseco. However, the Dodgers won the series in five games thanks to Kirk Gibson's pinch-hit game winning homer in the first game off of Dennis Eckersley and the continued mastery of series MVP Orel Hershiser.

Awards

1988 Major League Baseball All-Star Game
Orel Hershiser reserve
 National League Most Valuable Player Award
Kirk Gibson
 Cy Young Award
Orel Hershiser
 Manager of the Year Award
Tommy Lasorda
National League Championship MVP
Orel Hershiser
World Series Most Valuable Player
Orel Hershiser
Gold Glove Award
Orel Hershiser
Comeback Player of the Year Award
Tim Leary
Baseball Digest Rookie All-Star
Tim Belcher
TSN Manager of the Year Award
Tommy Lasorda

TSN Executive of the Year Award
Fred Claire
TSN Rookie Pitcher of the Year Award
Tim Belcher
TSN Pitcher of the Year Award
Orel Hershiser
Silver Slugger Award
Tim Leary
Kirk Gibson
TSN Major League Player of the Year Award
Orel Hershiser
TSN National League All-Star
Orel Hershiser
NL Pitcher of the Month
Orel Hershiser (April 1988)
Orel Hershiser (September 1988)
NL Player of the Week
Tim Leary (July 18–24)
Orel Hershiser (Sep. 26-Oct.2)

Farm system 

Teams in BOLD won League Championships

Major League Baseball Draft

The Dodgers drafted 62 players in this draft. Of those, 11 of them would eventually play Major League baseball. The Dodgers lost their second round pick to the Oakland Athletics as compensation for their signing free agent outfielder Mike Davis.

The top pick in the draft was Pitcher Bill Bene out of California State University, Los Angeles. In nine seasons in the Minors he had a record of 18–34 with a 5.45 ERA in 252 games (49 starts). In 2012, he was arrested and sentenced to six months in prison for operating a counterfeit karaoke business and failing to pay federal taxes.

This draft produced two of the Dodgers top players of the 1990s. In the sixth round they selected first baseman Eric Karros from UCLA. The 1992 Rookie of the Year and a 1995 Silver Slugger Award winner, Karros hit .268 with 284 homers and 1,027 RBI in 14 seasons (12 of them with the Dodgers) and is the L.A. Dodgers all-time home run leader.

In the 62nd round with their last pick of the draft the Dodgers selected Mike Piazza from Miami Dade College as a favor to his god-father, manager Tommy Lasorda. Piazza would win the 1993 Rookie of the Year Award and was a 12 time All-Star and 10 time Silver Slugger Award winner in his 16 seasons (mostly with the Dodgers and New York Mets). He hit .308 with 427 home runs and 1,335 RBI.

See also
Orel Hershiser's scoreless innings streak

References

External links 
1988 Los Angeles Dodgers uniform
Los Angeles Dodgers official web site
Baseball-Reference season page
Baseball Almanac season page

Los Angeles Dodgers seasons
Los Angeles Dodgers
National League West champion seasons
National League champion seasons
World Series champion seasons
Los Angeles Dodgers